Sigrid of Sweden, also Sigrith, may refer to:

Sigrid the Haughty, Swedish queen consort (questionable), 10th century
Sigrid, Swedish princess about 1188, daughter of King Canute I
Sigrid, Princess of Sweden 1567